Rivkin is a Slavic language-influenced Jewish surname, of matronymic derivation literally meaning "Rivka's", where Rivka is the Hebrew form of the name Rebecca. Other forms include  Rifkin (as a recording of a devoiced pronunciation) and Ryvkin (from the Russian-language variant Рывкин).

Notable people with the surname include:

Rifkin

 Adam Rifkin, American film director
 Jay Rifkin, record producer
 Jeremy Rifkin, American public policy writer
 Joel Rifkin, American serial killer
 Joshua Rifkin, conductor and musicologist
 Ron Rifkin, American actor and director
 Stanley Mark Rifkin, holder of the "biggest computer fraud" in the Guinness Book of World Records

Rivkin

 William R. Rivkin (born 1919), former United States Ambassador to Senegal, the Gambia, and Luxembourg
 Robert S. Rivkin (born 1960), deputy mayor of the City of Chicago and former United States Department of Transportation general counsel
 Charles H. Rivkin (born 1962), chief executive officer of the MPAA and former United States ambassador to France
 David W. Rivkin (born 1955), litigation partner at Debevoise & Plimpton LLP
 David B. Rivkin, American conservative
 Jan W. Rivkin, American academic, professor at the Harvard Business School
 Bobby "Z" Rivkin, known as Bobby Z. former drummer for Prince
 David Z (David Rivkin) a music producer
 Neta Rivkin (born 1991), Israeli rhythmic gymnast
 René Rivkin, Australian entrepreneur

Ryvkin
Vladimir Ryvkin (1928-1989), birth name of Vladimir Sanin, Russian traveler and writer

See also 
Rifkind, a surname and list of people with the name
Rivlin

Matronymic surnames
Yiddish-language surnames

ru:Ривкин